Shindaw was one of the 37 nats in the Burmese pantheon of nats. He was a young novice monk of Innwa and died of a snake bite. He is portrayed standing on a pedestal with headwear, and a yellow robe. He holds a fan in his right hand and rosary beads in his left.

References

15
Deaths due to snake bites